John Hartigan may refer to:

John Patrick Hartigan (1887–1968), American jurist
John Hartigan, American captain of 1911 Boston College football team
John Hartigan (rowing) (1940–2020), American coxswain
John Hartigan (media executive)  (born 1947), Australian journalist
John Hartigan, American Emmy nominee in 2014 Primetime Emmy Award for Outstanding Special Visual Effects
John Hartigan, Australian director of Land Registry, subordinate in 2001 to Elizabeth O'Keeffe
John Hartigan, English Labour Party candidate in Shipston ward of 2017 Warwickshire County Council election

Characters
John Hartigan (Sin City), major protagonist in 1990s American graphic novels by Frank Miller